Bilal Salaam is an American independent, experimental composer.

Musical career 
A graduate of Rutgers University, Bilal Salaam's sound was described by Soul Culture magazine as "a left of centre, soulful Kid A".

Washington D.C.'s City Paper characterized "Heart Alarm", the single from Salaam's third album, Pedagogia Do Oprimido, as "calm", "quirky", and "acquired".

Kevin Nottingham called Bilal's Boulder, a 2012 release, "seven tracks of sheer aural orgasms".

Prior to recording as a solo artist, Bilal Salaam toured internationally with the Morgan State University Choir, and Raheem DeVaughn.

Discography

Albums

Production
Ruff Drafts Volume 1 (Track: 8) – JapaNUBIA Musik 2006
Langue De Rasoir (Tracks: 1, 3, 5 & 6) – Noohustle 2008
Peau Noire, Masques Blancs (Tracks: All) – Noohustle 2008
Dirty Soul Electric (Track: 5) – BBE 2008
The Awakening (Track: 5) – JapaNUBIA Musik 2008
Border Breaker (Tracks: All(Vocal Production)) – Ghetto Falsetto 2009
Before Taxes (Track: 5) – Mello Music 2010
the Earn (Track: 10(Vocal Production)) – Mello Music 2011
Pedagogia Do Oprimido (Tracks: All) – Noohustle 2011
Bilal's Boulder (Tracks: All) – Noohustle 2012

Guest appearances
Thinking Back, Looking Forward (Track: 5) – Neosonic Productions 2004
Ruff Drafts Volume 1 (Track: 4) – JapaNUBIA Musik 2006
Artifact Hearts Volume One (Track: 15) – Ankh Ba 2006
93 Million Miles & Rising (Track: 1) – Ankh Ba 2006
Cuba After Market (Tracks: 1 & 12) – Humble Monarch Music/Rawkus 50 2007
Develop (Track: 2A) – Soul Step 2007
Zen Badism (Track: 9) – Freedom School 2008
Dirty Soul Electric (Track: 5) – BBE 2008
Distraction City (Track: 13) – Tasteful Licks 2008
Conflict (Track: 4) – Sy Smith 2008
Mental Liberation (Track: 3) – Mello Music 2009
Random Joints (Track: 3) – Low Budget 2009
Before Taxes (Tracks: 5 & 16) – Mello Music 2010
the Earn (Track: 5) – Mello Music 2011
Oakwood Grain (Track: 2–10) – Humble Monarch Music 2012
The Many Districts Of Soulful Shanghai (Tracks: 3, 10 & 14) – Kindred Spirits 2012
"Fleeting Physical" – (Produced by Ya'koob of Sons of Yusuf) The Base Productions 2012
(Vibe)Rations (Track: 11) – Iman Omari Music 2013
The Booth Shall Set You Free (Track: 12) – Soul Spazm 2014
Persona (Track: 16) – Mello Music 2015
Odds & Ends (Track: 5) – Mello Music 2015
I'm The Bridge You Must Burn (Track: 18) – Mello Music 2016 
Being You Is Great, I Wish I Could Be You More Often (Track: 14) – Mello Music 2017 
Sunday Mass (Track: 9) – Mello Music 2019 
Straight Shot (Track: 10) – Mello Music 2019

References

External links

Official website
Bilal Salaam discography at Discogs
"Heart Alarm", official video

Year of birth missing (living people)
Living people
21st-century American rappers
American music arrangers
American electronic musicians
Musicians from Newark, New Jersey
Record producers from New Jersey
Songwriters from New Jersey
Morgan State University alumni
University of the Arts (Philadelphia) alumni
Rutgers University alumni